Rozen-e-Deewar is the first album recorded by Pakistani music band Roxen. Blending pop and rock, Roxen's debut album was released on August 31, 2006.

Rozen-e-Deewar was released under Fire Records (Pakistan), Hom Records (India) & Sangeet Records (United States, Canada, North America & almost all over the world).

Etymology 
"Rozen-e-Deewar" is an Urdu word which means "A hole in a wall (of a prison cell) from which a ray of light emerges which gives hope and freshness". The name of the band is also a corruption of the same word (Roxen) and was suggested by Kashaan, a friend of Mustafa Zahid.

Track listing
"Sapnay"
"Chaltay Rahay"
"Tau Phir Aao"
"Aaj"
"Lams"
"Rozen-e-Deewar"
"Jag Chor Dia"
"Yaadein"
"Mujhko Satao"
"Malangi"

Critical reception
Rozen-e-Deewar has received positive reviews. Rizwana Malik of PakManzil called it worth the wait. Shahzeb Sheikh of Instep Magazine also gave a positive review and said, "Rozen-e-Deewar is a complete album in the sense that it caters to both rock freaks as well as listeners who like soft songs..."

Awards and nominations
Rozen-e-Deewar was nominated for Best Album at the 7th Lux Style Awards.

References

External links
Rozen-E-Deewar Review
Musicbox's review - Rozen-e-Deewar's review in the Musicbox, A weekly of newspaper "Dawn"
Jang's review - Rozen-e-Deewar's review in the Pakistani Newspaper "Jang".
Pakmanzil - Album's Review on PakManzil.
On Gulf daily News - 'Gulf Daily News' Article About the Debut Album.

2006 albums
Roxen (band) albums
Urdu-language albums